The  is a Japanese Shinkansen high-speed rail line on the northwest part of Kyushu Island that is operated by the Kyushu Railway  Company (JR Kyushu). A segment of the line that connects Nagasaki to  commenced service on 23 September 2022.

However, as of 2022, the route of the segment east of Takeo-Onsen to Hakata via Saga has yet to be determined, with construction yet to commence. It  remains unclear when the entire line will be completed. For the foreseeable future, the Relay Kamome limited express service will continue to provide a connection to Hakata.

Services
Initially, there is only one service type, named Kamome. All Kamome services stop at Takeo-Onsen, Isahaya and Nagasaki, while most stops at the other two stations.

The relay service is either the Relay Kamome or a Midori/Huis Ten Bosch acting as a Relay Kamome.

Stations
Legend:

Rolling stock
All services are formed of 6-car N700S series trainsets.

With the start of the Nishi Kyushu Shinkansen, trains are operated by a fleet of four JR Kyushu N700S series trainsets.

History

Initial route selection
Plans for a Shinkansen between Fukuoka and Nagasaki was first laid out in 1971 by the Ministry of Transport. The construction of the route was decided in the 1973 basic plan. At the time the route was decreed to pass through Saga, split from the main Kyushu Shinkansen route in Tsukushi Plain, and share the route with the Kyushu Shinkansen to Fukuoka. In 1985 Japanese National Railways published a map of the line that ran via Haiki in Sasebo.

In 1992, JR Kyushu published a report on the revenue of the route on the premise that it would be built with Shinkansen-level facilities but with track gauge in narrow gauge (Super Tokkyū) instead of the standard gauge normally used in Shinkansen routes. In 2002, the Japan Railway Construction, Transport and Technology Agency (JRTT) applied for permission to build the line between Takeo-Onsen and Nagasaki in Super Tokkyū standard.

Start of construction
JRTT applied for permission to build the  segment between Takeo-Onsen and Isahaya on 19 March 2008, and was granted on 26 March. Construction of the segment began on 28 April 2008.

Debate over the final section between Isahaya and Nagasaki continued for several years, before construction was approved by the government. On 26 December 2012 the Japanese government issued a policy that the under-construction segment between Takeo-Onsen and Isahaya, and the segment yet to break ground between Isahaya and Nagasaki shall be built together as a variable gauge system. Permission to build the line between Takeo-Onsen and Nagasaki as a standard gauge Shinkansen was applied on 12 June 2012, and was granted on 29 June.

Abandonment of Gauge Change Trains and reconsideration of route
The initial plan involved utilizing the existing narrow gauge track from Shin-Tosu to Takeo-Onsen as well as duplicating the  Hizen Yamaguchi to Takeo-Onsen section, and building a new Shinkansen line from Takeo-Onsen to Nagasaki. It was proposed that Gauge Change Train (GCT) trainsets be used, however technical issues resulted in the cancellation of the GCT, requiring the consideration of other options. The GCT was expected to allow travel times of around 1 hour 20 minutes between Hakata to Nagasaki, versus the 1 hour 50 minutes currently operated by the 885 series. If the entire route was constructed to Shinkansen standards, the travel time would be 51 minutes.

The current plan is to continue using the existing narrow gauge track with a cross platform interchange at Takeo-Onsen Station until the finalization of the remaining section to Shin-Tosu.

Saga Prefecture, through which the line was planned to pass with a stop at Saga Station, has refused to allow the construction of the full line to Shin-Tosu. The reasons stated by Saga's prefectural governor are the lack of advantages gained by the prefecture compared to the price of building and maintaining the full Shinkansen line. Saga Prefecture estimates that their burden would be over 240 billion yen, much higher than that of Nagasaki Prefecture's estimated burden of 100 billion yen. In addition, the travel time from Saga to Hakata would only be shortened by around 15 minutes. There is also the issue of the status of the conventional Nagasaki Main Line after the construction of the West Kyushu route. Saga Prefecture would prefer that JR Kyushu continue to operate the line as opposed to transferring them over to a third-sector company, as commonly practiced around the country after the construction of a Shinkansen line.

Following the decision not to use GCTs, Nagasaki Prefecture pushed for the remaining segment to be built in Shinkansen standard on the premise that it offers better convenience and shorter travel time, while Saga Prefecture opposes building in Shinkansen standard as it will need to pay a significant part of the budget despite there being no substantial change in travel time compared to preexisting services. A decision on whether to build the remaining segment in Shinkansen standard, or a Mini-shinkansen with standard gauge tracks but slower speed, was to be made in the summer of 2018, but due to financial concerns from Saga Prefecture it was postponed. On 5 August 2019 a committee in the governing party decided that the segment should be built in Shinkansen standard. Saga Prefecture expressed strong opposition to this, and opined that all possible options (Super Tokkyū, Gauge Change Train, relay train method, Mini-shinkansen and full Shinkansen standard) should be evaluated thoroughly. On 28 October 2019 Saga Prefecture and the Ministry of Land, Infrastructure, Transport and Tourism agreed that the two sides should continue holding discussions on this matter. In 2021 Saga Prefecture proposed to the government that the full line be built either north along the Nagasaki Expressway, or south connecting to Chikugo-Funagoya Station via Saga Airport.

As of September 2022, the opening of the segment between Takeo-Onsen and Hakata remains unknown as no constructions have been approved or initiated. Debates on how the segment will be operated are still ongoing.

References

External links
  

High-speed railway lines in Japan
Lines of Kyushu Railway Company
Railway lines opened in 2022
Standard gauge railways in Japan
2022 establishments in Japan